is a former Japanese pop singer and songwriter under the Giza Studio label.

Biography
Before her solo debut, Ai participated in the cover album "The Hit Parade" covering the song Sono Mama Kinisanaide (by Candies) alongside Giza singers Aiko Kitahara and Yuka Saegusa. Produced by Tak Matsumoto of Japanese rock band B'z.

In 2004 she debuted with single Kimi no Soba de composed by Aika Ohno and produced by Akihito Tokunaga. The most well-known song is "Koi Hanabi" which was produced by Nakano Junko. The song was used as a theme song for Tokyo Broadcasting System Television television drama Kodomo no Jijou. It was later included in two Giza Studio compilation albums as representative song.

In 2007, she performed cover of Field of View's biggest hit Totsuzen on Hill PanKoujou event Being 90's Party along with from NaokI Ko-jin from Naifu.

In 2008 single Gomenne Ima demo Suki de Imasu was her last work which reached into Oricon Weekly Charts, the song was used as an ending theme for television music program Music B.B.

She was active in Giza until 2009. In 2010 she moved to Box Corporation agency under Posuka label.

In 2011 her official blog announced that she was taking a break from music.

Discography

Singles

Albums

Magazine Interview
From Music Freak Magazine:
Vol.111 2004/February
Vol.112 2004/March
Vol.115 2004/June
Vol.117 2004/August
Vol.119 2004/October
Vol.132 2005/November
Vol.137 2006/April
Vol.141 2006/August
Vol.151 2007/August
Vol.162 2008/June
Vol.166 2008/October
Vol.169 2009/January
Vol.172 2009/April

From Hot Express:
Takaoka Ai special interview

From J-Groove Magazine:
August/2005
May/2006

References

External links
Official website: 
Official blog: 
Official MySpace: 

Living people
Being Inc. artists
Japanese women singer-songwriters
20th-century Japanese women singers
20th-century Japanese singers
1982 births